Orthanthera is a genus of plants in the family Apocynaceae, first described as a genus in 1834. It is native to India and Africa.

Species
 Orthanthera albida Schinz - Namibia
 Orthanthera butayei (De Wild.) Werderm. - Zaire
 Orthanthera gossweileri C.Norman - Angola
 Orthanthera jasminiflora (Decne.) N.E.Br. ex Schinz - South Africa
 Orthanthera stricta Hiern - Angola
 Orthanthera viminea Wight - Uttar Pradesh in India

References

Apocynaceae genera
Asclepiadoideae